Cry Wolf is a 1969 British film for the Children's Film Foundation starring Janet Munro and Ian Hendry.
 It concerns two children Tony and Mary, who discover a plot to kidnap the prime minister.

Cast
Anthony Kemp as Tony
Mary Burleigh as Mary
Martin Beaumont as Martin
Judy Cornwell as Stella
Eileen Moore as Muriel Walker
Maurice Kaufmann as Jim Walker
John Trenaman as Ben
Rex Stallings as Marksman
Alfred Bell as Insp. Blake
Mary Yeomans as Mrs. Whittle
Pat Coombs as Mrs. Blades
Kevin Manser as Town clerk
Alec Bregonzi as Sound man
Wilfrid Brambell Delivery man (as Wilfred Brambell)
Adrienne Corri as Mrs. Quinn - woman in tobacconist's shop
Walter Gotell as Walter Gotell		
Ian Hendry as Hobson
Janet Munro as Polly
Roy Moore

References

External links

1969 films
Children's Film Foundation
1960s children's films
1960s British films